Molly Dean may refer to:

Molly Dean, character in A Night Like This (film)
Molly Dean, character in Headline (film)